In mathematics, particularly functional analysis, spaces of linear maps between two vector spaces can be endowed with a variety of topologies. Studying space of linear maps and these topologies can give insight into the spaces themselves. 

The article operator topologies discusses topologies on spaces of linear maps between normed spaces, whereas this article discusses topologies on such spaces in the more general setting of topological vector spaces (TVSs).

Topologies of uniform convergence on arbitrary spaces of maps

Throughout, the following is assumed:
 is a topological vector space (not necessarily Hausdorff or locally convex).
 is a basis of neighborhoods of 0 in 

𝒢-topology

The following sets will constitute the basic open subsets of topologies on spaces of linear maps.
For any subsets  and  let

The family 

forms a neighborhood basis 
at the origin for a unique translation-invariant topology on  where this topology is  necessarily a vector topology (that is, it might not make  into a TVS). 
However, this name is frequently changed according to the types of sets that make up  (e.g. the "topology of uniform convergence on compact sets" or the "topology of compact convergence", see the footnote for more details).

In this case, the collection  can be replaced by  without changing the topology on  
One may also replace  with the collection of all subsets of all finite unions of elements of  without changing the resulting -topology on 

Properties

Properties of the basic open sets will now be described, so assume that  and  
Then  is an absorbing subset of  if and only if for all   absorbs . 
If  is balanced (respectively, convex) then so is 

The equality

always holds. 
If  is a scalar then  so that in particular, 
Moreover,

and similarly

For any subsets  and any non-empty subsets  

which implies:
if  then 
if  then 
For any  and subsets  of  if  then 

Uniform structure

 
Given  the family of all sets  as  ranges over any fundamental system of entourages of  forms a fundamental system of entourages for a uniform structure on  called  or simply . 
The  is the least upper bound of all -convergence uniform structures as  ranges over   

Nets and uniform convergence

Inherited properties

Local convexity

Hausdorffness

Suppose that  is a topological space. 

Boundedness

Examples of 𝒢-topologies

Pointwise convergence

𝒢-topologies on spaces of continuous linear maps

 will be a non-empty collection of subsets of  directed by inclusion. 

Note in particular that this is the case if  consists of (von-Neumann) bounded subsets of

Assumptions on 𝒢

Assumptions that guarantee a vector topology

 ( is directed):  will be a non-empty collection of subsets of  directed by (subset) inclusion. That is, for any  there exists  such that .

The above assumption guarantees that the collection of sets  forms a filter base. 
The next assumption will guarantee that the sets  are balanced. 
Every TVS has a neighborhood basis at 0 consisting of balanced sets so this assumption isn't burdensome.

 ( are balanced):  is a neighborhoods basis of the origin in  that consists entirely of balanced sets.

The following assumption is very commonly made because it will guarantee that each set  is absorbing in 

 ( are bounded):  is assumed to consist entirely of bounded subsets of 

The next theorem gives ways in which  can be modified without changing the resulting -topology on 

Common assumptions

Some authors (e.g. Narici) require that  satisfy the following condition, which implies, in particular, that  is directed by subset inclusion: 

Some authors (e.g. Trèves) require that  be directed under subset inclusion and that it satisfy the following condition:
If  is a saturated family of bounded subsets of  then these axioms are also satisfied.

Properties

Hausdorffness

Completeness

 is complete if
If  is barrelled then  is Hausdorff and quasi-complete.

Boundedness

Let  and  be topological vector spaces and  be a subset of  
Then the following are equivalent:
For every neighborhood  of the origin in  the set  absorbs every 

Examples

The topology of pointwise convergence

Unfortunately, this topology is also sometimes called the strong operator topology, which may lead to ambiguity; for this reason, this article will avoid referring to this topology by this name.

The weak-topology on  has the following properties: 
 So in particular, on every equicontinuous subset of  the topology of pointwise convergence is metrizable.
 In addition,  is dense in the space of all linear maps (continuous or not)  into 

Equicontinuous subsets

Compact convergence

The topology of compact convergence on  has the following properties:
If  is a Fréchet space or a LF-space and if  is a complete locally convex Hausdorff space then  is complete.
On equicontinuous subsets of  the following topologies coincide:
 The topology of pointwise convergence on a dense subset of 
 The topology of pointwise convergence on 
 The topology of compact convergence.
 The topology of precompact convergence.

Topology of bounded convergence

The topology of bounded convergence on  has the following properties:
If  is a bornological space and if  is a complete locally convex Hausdorff space then  is complete.

Polar topologies

Throughout, we assume that  is a TVS.

𝒢-topologies versus polar topologies

Consequently, in this case the results mentioned in this article can be applied to polar topologies.

One important difference is that polar topologies are always locally convex while -topologies need not be.

Polar topologies have stronger results than the more general topologies of uniform convergence described in this article and we refer the read to the main article: polar topology. 
We list here some of the most common polar topologies.

List of polar topologies

Suppose that  is a TVS whose bounded subsets are the same as its weakly bounded subsets.

𝒢-ℋ topologies on spaces of bilinear maps

Let  denote the collection of all sets  where   

If both  and  consist of bounded sets then this requirement is automatically satisfied if we are topologizing but this may not be the case if we are trying to topologize . 
The -topology on  will be compatible with the vector space structure of  if both  and  consists of bounded sets and any of the following conditions hold:

The ε-topology

Then the -topology on  will be a topological vector space topology. 

When this subspace is given the subspace topology of  it is denoted by 

These spaces have the following properties:

See also

References

Bibliography

  
  
  
   
  
  
  

Functional analysis
Topological vector spaces
Topology of function spaces